Michelle Stennett (born November 2, 1960) is a Democratic Idaho State Senator for District 26 (Ketchum) since 2010. She was elected to the Idaho Senate in 2010, succeeding her late husband Clint Stennett. Stennett currently serves as senate minority leader. Stennett announced on February 7, 2022 that she would not seek re-election.

Early life and education
Stennett was born in Sacramento, California, and earned her degrees in Latin languages and international studies from the University of Oregon.

Senate appointment and career
Stennett served as the acting state senator for the 25th District in 2010 due to her husband's declining health; he died in October 2010. The following month she was elected to the seat with 7,113 votes (57.9%) against Republican Jim Donoval and Constitution Party candidate Randall K. Patterson. Redistricted to new Senate District 26, Stennett ran unopposed in the May 15, 2012 Democratic primary with 806 votes with no opposition for the November 6, 2012 general election.

Committees
Stennett currently serves on the following committees:
Resources & Environment
State Affairs

She also previously served on the following committees:
Finance Appropriations
Finance
Health & Welfare

References

External links 
Official government profile at the Idaho Legislature
Campaign website
 

1960 births
21st-century American politicians
21st-century American women politicians
Democratic Party Idaho state senators
Living people
People from Ketchum, Idaho
Politicians from Sacramento, California
University of Oregon alumni
Women state legislators in Idaho